Jenna Morasca is an American actress, former swimsuit model, professional wrestler and American reality TV contestant who was the million-dollar grand prize winner of Survivor: The Amazon in 2003. In 2009, she worked for Total Nonstop Action Wrestling.

In 2011, Morasca and her then-boyfriend, fellow Survivor winner Ethan Zohn, participated in the 19th season of The Amazing Race. They were one of the two teams eliminated in a double-elimination, finishing tenth for the season.

Early life
Jenna Morasca was born in Pittsburgh, Pennsylvania. She is an only child. Before appearing on Survivor, Morasca was a college student at the University of Pittsburgh, where she was initiated into Zeta Tau Alpha.

Morasca graduated from South Fayette High School in 1999, and studied at Duquesne University for two years before transferring to University of Pittsburgh.

Career
Morasca worked as a swimsuit model. As of January 2021, she works as a veterinary nurse.

Survivor
Morasca's Survivor career began on Survivor: The Amazon, in which she was originally part of the all-female Jaburu tribe. In 2003, Morasca was invited back for Survivor: All-Stars. In 2005, Morasca replaced Richard Hatch as co-host (with Dalton Ross) of CBS's Survivor Live, an internet talk show devoted to the then-current season of Survivor. She has since hosted the show throughout five entire seasons - Survivor: Palau, Survivor: Guatemala, Survivor: Panama, Survivor: Cook Islands and Survivor: Fiji.

The Amazon
During one immunity challenge on Survivor: The Amazon, Morasca and fellow contestant Heidi Strobel stripped off their clothes for peanut butter and chocolate. After making the merge, Morasca was relatively safe at the start as the majority of the tribe chose to vote off outcasts Roger Sexton and Dave Johnson. With eight players remaining, the new alliance of Morasca, Strobel, Alex Bell and Rob Cesternino targeted Deena Bennett, and she was voted out. At the Final Seven, Cesternino betrayed his alliance by voting out Bell. At the Final Six, Morasca and Strobel scrambled to stay in the game, trying to break up the alliance of Cesternino, Matthew von Ertfelda and Butch Lockley. When Christy Smith would not commit to either side, Cesternino convinced Morasca and Strobel to help vote out Smith, who was later voted off. At the Final Five, Strobel was voted out, but Morasca won the next immunity, allowing her to advance to the Final Three. Morasca, Cesternino and von Ertfelda voted out Lockley. Morasca won the key final immunity challenge which gave her the sole power to eliminate either Cesternino or von Ertfelda and eventually eliminated Cesternino. Morasca beat von Ertfelda in a 6–1 vote to become the Sole Survivor. Morasca was the youngest contestant to ever win Survivor until Jud "Fabio" Birza won Survivor: Nicaragua in 2010, though Morasca remains the youngest female contestant to win Survivor.

All-Stars
As part of the Mogo Mogo tribe on Survivor: All-Stars, Morasca and her tribe won immunity in the first two episodes. In Episode Three, Morasca decided to quit the game, out of a desire to be with her dying mother, who had been battling cancer for 12 years, making her the third person eliminated from the competition. Her mother died eight days after Morasca returned home.

Total Nonstop Action Wrestling (2009)
Morasca made her professional wrestling debut on the March 12, 2009 episode of Total Nonstop Action Wrestling's TNA Impact! program, in a backstage interview with Mick Foley. She then appeared in backstage segments with Kevin Nash and his alliance The Main Event Mafia. It was later revealed by Kurt Angle that Morasca was the financial backer to the Mafia, and the money she provided was used to lure Samoa Joe to the stable, establishing Morasca as a heel in the process. Morasca was regularly seen bickering with fellow Mafia valet Sharmell, leading to a catfight backstage on the edition of May 28 of Impact!.

On the July 9 edition of Impact it was revealed that Morasca had hired Awesome Kong to train her for her upcoming match against Sharmell at Victory Road where she defeated Sharmell. The match was very poorly received, receiving the "Worst Worked Match of the Year" award for 2009 from readers of the Wrestling Observer Newsletter. Figure Four Weekly Bryan Alvarez, reviewing Victory Road for The Bryan and Vinny Show, called it the worst women's match he had ever seen. Giving it a minus 4-star rating, he said he was unable to remember the last time he had done so because it had been so long since he had seen a match that bad. Reviewing the match for WrestleCrap, "Triple Kelly" Kelly Parmalee called it "the absolute worst wrestling match I have EVER seen in my life" and compared it negatively to "That Jackie Gayda Match" from the July 8, 2002 episode of Monday Night Raw.

Other television and film appearances
In 2003, Morasca had a part in the Off Broadway play Pieces. In 2004, she was on the board of directors for Animal Friends in Pittsburgh. In 2005, she appeared in a minor role in the made-for-TV movie The Scorned.

Morasca was a contestant on the February 28, 2005 episode of Fear Factor, which starred former reality television contestants. She was eliminated in the second round by Omarosa Manigault-Stallworth.

In October 2006, she appeared in the premiere episode of Celebrity Paranormal Project on VH-1, along with other notables such as Gary Busey.

In 2011, Morasca and her then-boyfriend, fellow Survivor winner Ethan Zohn, participated in the 19th season of The Amazing Race. They checked-in at fourth place in the opening leg. In the second episode, which featured the show's first ever double elimination, Morasca and Zohn arrived at the Pit Stop in ninth place, which would have just spared them from elimination; however, they had to return to the orphanage they visited in that leg to donate all of their money, which resulted in them dropping to tenth-place resulting in their elimination.

Morasca and Zohn also appeared together as guest sous chefs on the seventh episode of the first season of the Food Network show Dinner: Impossible entitled "Stranded: Deserted Island: Impossible", and on the premiere of the fourth season of the Celebrity Apprentice, in which they supported their former Survivor castmate Richard Hatch was a contestant.

In 2011, Morasca and Zohn also starred in The Watcher, a 20-minute horror movie included in the Drive-In Horror Show series,

Modeling
Morasca's strip with fellow contestant Heidi Strobel led to a nude pictorial in the August 2003 Playboy magazine.

She also appeared near-nude in an anti-fur ad for PETA with her boyfriend, Survivor: Africa winner Ethan Zohn, that featured the slogan "We'd Rather Go Naked Than Wear Fur!"

Morasca modeled swimwear and was the CEO of a model scouting company called Model Challenge USA, which she founded in 2004.

Personal life
Morasca began dating fellow Survivor champion Ethan Zohn after her victory on Survivor: The Amazon in 2003. They lived in Manhattan, though not together. In an interview on Rob Has a Podcast, it was revealed that Morasca and Zohn were considered to return in Survivor: South Pacific, after applying for The Amazing Race. The couple declined the offer, saying they were not interested in competing against each other. In February 2013, Morasca and Zohn confirmed that they had amicably ended their relationship after ten years together.

On January 25, 2018, Morasca was arrested in Washington, Pennsylvania and charged with driving under the influence and possession of narcotics paraphernalia. According to the police report, Morasca was unconscious while the vehicle was stopped at a stop sign, with the engine still running. The person sitting in the vehicle's passenger seat was caught by police putting a plastic baggie with syringes in her purse. When paramedics arrived, they administered Naloxone to Morasca, who was physically combative throughout the process, biting a police officer's arm after having been placed in an ambulance. In a January 2021 interview, Morasca commented on the reports of the  incident, stating, "Don't believe everything you read." She later explicitly denied she was arrested or charged, writing on her Instagram, "I'm doing great (and I've NEVER been arrested or got a DUI like a million websites like to say)! I had a tough go after my dad died suddenly, but I was able to get myself together and keep moving forward with the help of an incredible support system."

Championships and accomplishments
 Wrestling Observer Newsletter
 Worst Worked Match of the Year (2009) vs. Sharmell at Victory Road

Filmography

Film

Television

References

External links

 
 Jenna Morasca biography for Survivor: The Amazon at CBS.com
 Jenna Morasca biography for Survivor: All-Stars at CBS.com

Living people
Duquesne University alumni
Actresses from Pittsburgh
Survivor (American TV series) winners
The Amazing Race (American TV series) contestants
University of Pittsburgh alumni
American female professional wrestlers
American professional wrestlers of Italian descent
Professional wrestlers from Pennsylvania
Female models from Pittsburgh
Year of birth missing (living people)
Winners in the Survivor franchise